A total solar eclipse occurred on May 22, 1724. A solar eclipse occurs when the Moon passes between Earth and the Sun, thereby totally or partly obscuring the image of the Sun for a viewer on Earth. A total solar eclipse occurs when the Moon's apparent diameter is larger than the Sun's, blocking all direct sunlight, turning day into darkness. Totality occurs in a narrow path across Earth's surface, with the partial solar eclipse visible over a surrounding region thousands of kilometres wide.

Observations 
This solar eclipse crossed Ireland and Great Britain near sunset, north-west to south-east track, from Galway to southern Wales and Devon in the west, eastwards to Hampshire and Sussex, but passing to the south of London. It was to be 203 years before a total solar eclipse was next witnessed from the British mainland, which had previously seen a total eclipse just nine years before, and Ireland will not see a total solar eclipse until 2090.

It crossed what would later become the city Los Angeles, CA in the morning, which was not settled until after 1771, 47 years later. The next total eclipse over Los Angeles will not occur until April 1, 3290.

Related eclipses
It is a part of solar Saros 133.

See also
 List of solar eclipses visible from the United Kingdom 1000–2090 AD

References

External links
 NASA chart graphics
 Googlemap
 NASA Besselian elements

1724 5 22
1724 in science
1724 5 22